Wilhelm Stasch (March 12, 1911 – August 1989) was a German boxer who competed in the 1936 Summer Olympics. He was born in Kray. In 1936 he was eliminated in the second round of the bantamweight class after losing his fight to Oscar de Larrazábal. Stasch's career lasted nearly 30 years with almost 700 fights. He was the German national champion in 1936.

References

External links
Wilhelm Stasch

1911 births
1989 deaths
Bantamweight boxers
Olympic boxers of Germany
Boxers at the 1936 Summer Olympics
German male boxers
Sportspeople from North Rhine-Westphalia